Advaita Acharya (1434–1559), (born Kamalaksha Mishra; কমলাক্ষ মিশ্র), was a companion of the founder of the Gaudiya Vaishnava movement, Chaitanya Mahaprabhu, and guru of Haridasa Thakur. He was born in the village of Nabagram in Laud (in present-day Sunamganj District, Bangladesh), in 1434, some fifty years before Chaitanya, and spent most of his adult life in the town of Shantipur in Nadia with his wife and family. Advaita Acharya had six sons, Acyutananda Das (who also became a disciple of Chaitanya), Krisna Mishra, Gopala Das, Balarama Das Mishra (whose lineage became the zamindar of Krishna Chandra), Swarupa Das and Jagadisa Mishra.

Advaita Acharya contributed in two Sanskrit literature, named Yogabashishta-Bhaishta and Geeta Bhaishya. The ancestry and life of Advaita Acharya are narrated in a number of hagiographical works, which include the Balyalila-Sutra (1487?) of Krishnadasa in Sanskrit and the Advaitasutrakadacha of Krishnadasa, the Advaitamangala of Haricharanadasa, the  Advaitaprakasha of Ishana Nagara and the Advaitavilasa of Naraharidasa in Bengali. Many of his activities are described in the Chaitanya Charitamrta, the Chaitanya Mangala and the Chaitanya Bhagavata.

Life story 

Advaita Acharya was the son of Kubera Acharya. Kubera was the courtier of Divya Singh, the King of Laur. Kubera's father was Narsingha who was the minister of King Ganesha of Nadiyal.

In his latter years, Advaita Acharya became increasingly saddened by the pursuit of materialistic goals that, he believed, lead to a dysfunctional, unhappy society and concluded that the only solution was to offer prayers, begging his Supreme Lord Krishna to come as an Avatar and attract people back to the joy of the spiritual life. Advaita Acharya is said to have prayed for several months, crying out and worshiping him in the form of his Shaligram Shila with sacred Tulasi leaves and Ganges water. At the end of thirteen months during an eclipse of the full moon, his prayers were answered when Chaitanya Mahaprabhu was born.
It was also Advaita Acharya who first proclaimed Chaitanya to be God Himself by reciting the Vedic text 'namo brahmanya devāya go-brāhmaṇa hitāya ca jagaddhitāya kṛṣṇāya govindāya namo namaḥ' 'I salute Kṛṣṇa, Govinda, the god of brāhmaṇas who benefits cows and brāhmaṇas and the whole world.'
He is known to have been a close friend of both Chaitanya and Nityananda in their mission of spreading the Hare Krishna mantra.
On the day marking his birth members hold a celebration in his honour and read and discuss stories of his life.

Descendants of Advaita Acharya 
He has many lineages from two of his children.  Bijoy Krishna Goswami falls under one lineage. Renowned poet, playwright & musician Dwijendralal Ray was a descendant of Advaita Acharya from his mother's side & so was Dwijendralal's illustrious son Dilip Kumar Roy.

See also 

 Hare Krishna (mantra)
 Chaitanya Mahaprabhu
 Advaita Parivāra
 Nityananda
 Avatar
 Pancha Tattva (Vaishnavism)

References and notes

External links 
 Advaita Acharya - Detailed Life Story
 A website dedicated to Advaita Acharya

Gaudiya religious leaders
15th-century Bengalis
16th-century Bengalis
Bengali Hindu saints
Scholars from West Bengal
15th-century Hindu religious leaders
16th-century Hindu religious leaders
People from Tahirpur Upazila